Betty Smith Williams is an American nurse. Williams was the first African-American nurse to graduate from the nursing school at Case Western Reserve University (CWRU). She later became the first black person to teach at college or university level in California. Williams is also a co-founder of the National Black Nurses Association (NBNA).

Biography 
Williams earned her bachelor's degree in zoology from Howard University. Williams graduated with a doctorate from Case Western Reserve University's (CWRU) school of nursing in 1954, becoming the first black nurse to graduate from that school.

In 1956, Williams became the first black person to teach at both the college or university level in California. She was hired to teach public health nursing at the University of California, Los Angeles (UCLA). In 1971, Williams was a co-founder of the National Black Nurses Association (NBNA). From 1995 to 1999, Williams was the president of NBNA. In 1980, Williams became a fellow of the American Academy of Nursing.

References 

Year of birth missing (living people)
Living people
African-American nurses
Case Western Reserve University alumni
Howard University alumni
UCLA School of Nursing faculty
Fellows of the American Academy of Nursing
American women nurses
21st-century African-American people
21st-century African-American women